Paris Dauphine University - PSL (also known as Paris Dauphine - PSL or Dauphine - PSL) is a public research university based in Paris, France. It is one of the 13 universities formed by the division of the ancient University of Paris (metonymically known as the Sorbonne). It is the only French institution of higher education that is both a grande école and a university. Dauphine is also a founding member and constituent college of PSL University.

Dauphine is renowned for its teaching in finance, economics, mathematics, law, and business strategy. Dauphine is a selective university with the status of grand établissement; this unique legal status within the French higher education system allows Dauphine to be a selective university. On average, 90 to 95% of accepted students received either high distinctions or the highest distinctions at their French High School National Exam results (Examen National du Baccalauréat).

Dauphine is also a founding member and constituent college of PSL University; it ranks 1st in France and in the top 50 worldwide. It is also a member of the Conférence des Grandes Écoles.

History
Founded in 1968, Dauphine specialises in the organization and decision sciences: Management, Economics, Law, Political Science, Sociology, Applied Mathematics, Management Information Systems and Languages.

In 2009, Université Paris-Dauphine gained EQUIS (EFMD Quality Improvement System) accreditation, awarded by the European Foundation for Management Development.

In 2011, Université Paris-Dauphine became officially recognized as one of the 16 partners and co-founders of Paris Sciences et Lettres University .

International relations
Dauphine's international relations cover:
 Paris Dauphine University - PSL is also present in Tunisia, in London and in Madrid.
 180 agreements with more than 40 countries, including the Australian National University, New York University in the US, the University of Toronto and McGill University in Canada, LSE and UCL in the UK, the University of Hong Kong in Hong Kong, National Chengchi University in Taiwan, Bocconi University and Bologna University in Italy and Humboldt-Universitat-zu Berlin in Germany.
 6 joint diplomas with three universities:
 The Autonomous University of Madrid
 Goethe University, Frankfurt
 Ca' Foscari University of Venice, Venice
 24.9% international students enrolled in various programmes or diplomas in 2004/2005, including several students from Latin America, Eastern Europe and Asia.

Some notable Dauphine professors include Pierre-Louis Lions (Fields Medal in 1994), and Witold Litwin (inventor of linear hashing and fellow of the Association for Computing Machinery in France).

Admissions

The University Paris IX Dauphine is one of the very few universities allowed to legally practice the selection at the entrance of students in France. The legal vagueness related to this "status" as an experimental university allowed it to select students on the bases of their bac scores. This situation led Dauphine transitioning to the status of Grand établissement in 2004. On the other hand, there has always been a form of selection at the entrance to the 2nd cycle (graduate) for the Masters.

There is no admission bar as such at Paris-Dauphine University, since many criteria are taken into account in the evaluation of a bachelor's degree. However, 94.4% of those admitted in the first year of bachelor in June 2013 had obtained a good or very good honors degree.

67% of its students achieved "Very good" (distinction – summa cum laude) in the General Baccalaureate. Regarding Dauphine's most sought-after master's degrees, the admission rate is 3%.

Student associations 

Dauphine - PSL has a wide range of student associations in many fields. Among them are :

 Channel 9, the audiovisual society 
 Dauphine Discussion Débat, the political society
 Do's Musical, the musical society
 Ridau – Théâtre à Dauphine, the theater society
 Club Photo Dauphine, the photo society
 L'Oreille de Dauphine, association organizing music festivals 
 Bureau Des Arts, the art student union
 Le Forum, a student initiative syndicate 
 Cheer Up, association helping children fight against cancer
 Urbaine Dauphine, a student initiative promoting the urban culture 
Spi Dauphine organizing a regatta in Mediterranean sea
 Dauphine MUN, the Model United Nations society
 AIESEC Dauphine, the local committee of AIESEC
 Go To Togo, association which supports education in Togo

Rankings

National rankings
2015: 5th business school of France according to Eduniversal ranking
2010: 4th-best alumni network according to the Challenges magazine-Who's Who ranking (ENA, Polytechnique, HEC, Dauphine)
2016: best Master 2 in Finance according to Best-Masters.com
2016: 4th-best Master 2 in Business law according to Best-Masters.com
2008: 6th business school in France (ESSEC, HEC, ESCP EUROPE, Sciences Po, EM LYON, Dauphine)

International rankings
2020: As a part of Université PSL, Dauphine is ranked 36th-best university in the world according to the Shanghai ranking
2019: As a part of Université PSL, Dauphine is ranked 4th-best young university in the world according to Times Higher Education World University Rankings
2019: As a part of Université PSL, Dauphine is ranked 41st-best university in the world according to Times Higher Education World University Rankings
2018: 33rd-best master's degree in Management in the world according to QS Ranking
2017: As a part of Université PSL, Dauphine is ranked 72nd-best university in the world according to Times Higher Education World University Rankings and 32nd in the "reputation" category
2014: 36th-best university in the world for producing millionnaires
2013: 23rd-best university in the world in "Mathematics" according to the Shanghai ranking
2012: 18th-best university in the world in "Mathematics" according to the Shanghai ranking
2011: 18th-best university in the world in "Mathematics" according to the Shanghai ranking
2010: 97th/1,000 business schools of the world according to eduniversal ranking
2008: 64th university in the world according to the Ecole Supérieure des Mines de Paris ranking

Alumni

Head of States
 Boni Yayi: President of the Republic of Benin
 Raymond Ndong Sima: Prime Minister of Gabon
 Faure Gnassingbe: President of Togo
Business leaders
  Thierry Bolloré: CEO of Jaguar Land Rover, former CEO of  the Renault group
 Jacques Aigrain: Chairman & CEO of Swiss Re
 Michel Combes: CEO of SoftBank Group International ("SBGI"), former CEO of Alcatel-Lucent & former CEO of TDF
 Emmanuel Roman: CEO of PIMCO
 Christophe Chenut: CEO of Lacoste
 Jean-Christophe Coutures: CEO of Chivas Brothers, former CEO of Irish Distillers
 Thierry Morin: Chairman & CEO of Valeo
 François Pierson: Chairman of AXA France
 Bruno Bonnell: Chairman & founder of Infogrames, former CEO of Atari
 Régis Schultz: CEO of JD Sports
 Yannick Bolloré: CEO of Havas, chairman of the supervisory board of Vivendi, Vice Chairman of  Bolloré group
  Régis Arnoux: CEO and founder of Catering International Services
 Diane Barrière-Desseigne: CEO of Groupe Lucien Barrière
 Olivier François: President and CEO of Fiat 
 Jean-Luc Gérard: Chairman of Ford France
 Jean-Michel Severino: CEO of the French Development Agency
 Florent Menegaux: Chairman & CEO of Michelin group
  Philippe Dupont: Chairman of BPCE
  François-Xavier Clédat: CEO of Spie Batignolles
  Claude Czechowski: ex-CEO of CSC EMEA South & West
 Arnaud Lagardère: Chairman of Lagardère and of the Board of Directors of EADS
 Marc Rolland: Group CFO of Sodexo
Jean-Baptiste Chasseloup de Chatillon: Group CFO of Sanofi
Economists & Researchers
 Jean Tirole: economist; recipient of the Nobel Memorial Prize in Economic Sciences in 2014; author of The Theory of Corporate Finance, Princeton University Press 2006
 Agnès Bénassy-Quéré: deputy governor of Banque de France & chief economist at the Direction générale du Trésor
 Mathilde Lemoine: Group Chief Economist of  Edmond de Rothschild
 Thierry Aimar: French economist, specialist of the Austrian School of economics and history of economic thought
 Olivier Blanchard: chief economist of the International Monetary Fund 
 Jacques Attali: the first head of the  EBRD 
 Audrey Azoulay: UNESCO Director-General
 Nicolas Bouzou: French economist
 Bertrand Lemennicier: French economist 
 Guillaume Carlier: French mathematician
 Elie Cohen: French economist, Director of Research in CNRS
 Bintou Keita: UN Undersecretary General
 Cédric Villani: mathematician, awarded the Fields Medal in 2010
Politicians
 Nicolas Dupont-Aignan: French politician, deputy and president of Arise the Republic
 Hervé Mariton: French politician, Deputy and former Minister
 Hervé Novelli: French politician, Deputy and former Minister
Others
 Marc Levy: author
  Roland Minnerath: Archbishop of Dijon (France)
 Bernard Ramanantsoa: Chairman of HEC Paris
  Geoffroy Roux de Bézieux: entrepreneur, founder of The Phone House
 Jean-Marc Sylvestre: French journalist
 Nassim Nicholas Taleb: author of Fooled by Randomness and The Black Swan
 Philippe Verdier: radio and television journalist

Honorary degrees
John Campbell: professor of economics at Harvard University
Ronald Fagin: computer scientist at IBM Almaden Research Center
Eleanor M. Fox: professor at New York University
Jim Gray: computer scientist and Turing award winner
Oliver Hart: professor of economics at Harvard University
Paul Joskow: professor at Massachusetts Institute of Technology
Ehud Kalai: professor at Northwestern University and author of Kalai-Smorodinsky model
Hayne Ellis Leland: professor at University of California, Berkeley
Henry Mintzberg: professor of management at McGill University
David Newbery: Emeritus Professor of Economics at the Faculty of Economics, University of Cambridge
Edmund Phelps: professor at Columbia University and author of golden rule savings rate
Myron Scholes: economist and author of Black-Scholes model and Nobel prize
Robert J. Shiller: professor of finance at Yale School of Management and Nobel prize
Helmut Siekmann: professor at University of California, Berkeley
Tom Snijders: professor at Nuffield College, Oxford and at the University of Groningen
Herbert Spohn: professor at the Technical University Munich
Melchior Wathelet: Belgian politician
Adriana Lleras-Muney: professor of economics at University of California, Los Angeles

Notes and references

External links

Dauphine University, Paris website

Grands établissements
Educational institutions established in 1968
Universities descended from the University of Paris